NCSA Mosaic is a discontinued web browser, and one of the first to be widely available. It was instrumental in popularizing the World Wide Web and the general Internet by integrating multimedia such as text and graphics. It was named for its support of multiple Internet protocols, such as Hypertext Transfer Protocol, File Transfer Protocol, Network News Transfer Protocol, and Gopher. Its intuitive interface, reliability, personal computer support, and simple installation all contributed to its popularity within the web. Mosaic is the first browser to display images inline with text instead of in a separate window. It is often described as the first graphical web browser, though it was preceded by WorldWideWeb, the lesser-known Erwise, and ViolaWWW.

Mosaic was developed at the National Center for Supercomputing Applications (NCSA) at the University of Illinois at Urbana–Champaign beginning in late 1992. NCSA released it in 1993, and officially discontinued development and support on January 7, 1997. 

Starting in 1995, Mosaic lost market share to Netscape Navigator and only had a tiny fraction of users left by 1997, when the project was discontinued. Microsoft licensed Mosaic to create Internet Explorer in 1995.

History 

After trying ViolaWWW, David Thompson demonstrated it to the NCSA software design group. This inspired Marc Andreessen and Eric Bina – two programmers working at NCSA – to create Mosaic. Andreessen and Bina originally designed and programmed NCSA Mosaic for Unix's X Window System called xmosaic. Then, in December 1991, the Gore Bill created and introduced by then Senator and future Vice President Al Gore was passed, which provided the funding for the Mosaic project. Development began in December 1992. Marc Andreessen announced the project's first release, the "alpha/beta version 0.5," on January 23, 1993. Version 1.0 was released on April 22, 1993. Ports to Microsoft Windows and Macintosh were released in September. A port of Mosaic to the Amiga was available by October 1993. NCSA Mosaic for Unix (X Window System) version 2.0 was released on November 10, 1993. Version 1.0 for Microsoft Windows was released on November 11, 1993. From 1994 to 1997, the National Science Foundation supported the further development of Mosaic.

Marc Andreessen, the leader of the team that developed Mosaic, left NCSA and, with James H. Clark, one of the founders of Silicon Graphics, Inc. (SGI), and four other former students and staff of the University of Illinois, started Mosaic Communications Corporation. Mosaic Communications eventually became Netscape Communications Corporation, producing Netscape Navigator. Mosaic's popularity as a separate browser began to decrease after the 1994 release of Netscape Navigator the relevance of which was noted in The HTML Sourcebook: The Complete Guide to HTML: "Netscape Communications has designed an all-new WWW browser Netscape, that has significant enhancements over the original Mosaic program."

In 1994, SCO released Global Access, a modified version of SCO's Open Desktop Unix, which became the first commercial product to incorporate Mosaic. However, by 1998, the Mosaic user base had almost completely evaporated as users moved to other web browsers.

Licensing
The licensing terms for NCSA Mosaic were generous for a proprietary software program. In general, non-commercial use was free of charge for all versions (with certain limitations). Additionally, the X Window System/Unix version publicly provided source code (source code for the other versions was available after agreements were signed). Despite persistent rumors to the contrary, however, Mosaic was never released as open source software during its brief reign as a major browser; there were always constraints on permissible uses without payment.

, license holders included these:
 Amdahl Corporation
 Fujitsu Limited (Product: Infomosaic, a Japanese version of Mosaic. Price: Yen5,000 (approx US$50)
 Infoseek Corporation (Product: No commercial Mosaic. May use Mosaic as part of a commercial database effort)
 Quadralay Corporation (Consumer version of Mosaic. Also using Mosaic in its online help and information product, GWHIS. Price: US$249)
 Quarterdeck Office Systems Inc.
 The Santa Cruz Operation Inc. (Product: Incorporating Mosaic into "SCO Global Access", a communications package for Unix machines that works with SCO's Open Server. Runs a graphical e-mail service and accesses newsgroups.)
 SPRY Inc. (Products: A communication suite: Air Mail, Air News, Air Mosaic, etc. Also producing Internet In a Box with O'Reilly & Associates. Price: US$149–$399 for Air Series.)
 Spyglass, Inc. (Product: Relicensing to other vendors. Signed deal with Digital Equipment Corp., which would ship Mosaic with all its machines.)

Features
Robert Reid notes that Andreessen's team hoped:

Mosaic is based on the libwww library and thus supported a wide variety of Internet protocols included in the library: Archie, FTP, gopher, HTTP, NNTP, telnet, WAIS.

Mosaic is not the first web browser for Microsoft Windows; this is Thomas R. Bruce's little-known Cello. The Unix version of Mosaic was already famous before the Microsoft Windows, Amiga, and Mac versions were released. Other than displaying images embedded in the text (rather than in a separate window), Mosaic's original feature set is similar to the browsers on which it was modeled, such as ViolaWWW. But Mosaic was the first browser written and supported by a team of full-time programmers, was reliable and easy enough for novices to install, and the inline graphics reportedly proved immensely appealing. Mosaic is said to have made the Web accessible to the ordinary person for the first time and already had 53% market share in 1995.

Mosaic was the first browser to explore the concept of collaborative annotation in 1993 but never passed the test state.

Mosaic was the first browser that could submit forms to a server.

Impact 
Mosaic led to the Internet boom of the 1990s. Other browsers existed during this period, such as Erwise, ViolaWWW, MidasWWW, and tkWWW, but did not have the same effect as Mosaic on public use of the Internet.

In the October 1994 issue of Wired magazine, Gary Wolfe notes in the article titled "The (Second Phase of the) Revolution Has Begun: Don't look now, but Prodigy, AOL, and CompuServe are all suddenly obsolete – and Mosaic is well on its way to becoming the world's standard interface":

Reid also refers to Matthew K. Gray's website, Internet Statistics: Growth and Usage of the Web and the Internet, which indicates a dramatic leap in web use around the time of Mosaic's introduction.

David Hudson concurs with Reid:

Ultimately, web browsers such as Mosaic became the killer applications of the 1990s. Web browsers were the first to bring a graphical interface to search tools the Internet's burgeoning wealth of distributed information services. A mid-1994 guide lists Mosaic alongside the traditional, text-oriented information search tools of the time, Archie and Veronica, Gopher, and WAIS but Mosaic quickly subsumed and displaced them all. Joseph Hardin, the director of the NCSA group within which Mosaic was developed, said downloads were up to 50,000 a month in mid-1994.

In November 1992, there were twenty-six websites in the world and each one attracted attention. In its release year of 1993, Mosaic had a What's New page, and about one new link was being added per day. This was a time when access to the Internet was expanding rapidly outside its previous domain of academia and large industrial research institutions. Yet it was the availability of Mosaic and Mosaic-derived graphical browsers themselves that drove the explosive growth of the Web to over 10,000 sites by August 1995 and millions by 1998. Metcalfe expressed the pivotal role of Mosaic this way:

Legacy 
Netscape Navigator was later developed by Netscape, which employed many of the original Mosaic authors; however, it intentionally shared no code with Mosaic. Netscape Navigator's code descendant is Mozilla Firefox.

Spyglass, Inc. licensed the technology and trademarks from NCSA for producing its own web browser but never used any of the NCSA Mosaic source code. Microsoft licensed Spyglass Mosaic in 1995 for US$2 million, modified it, and renamed it Internet Explorer. After a later auditing dispute, Microsoft paid Spyglass $8 million. The 1995 user guide The HTML Sourcebook: The Complete Guide to HTML, specifically states, in a section called Coming Attractions, that Internet Explorer "will be based on the Mosaic program". Versions of Internet Explorer before version 7 stated "Based on NCSA Mosaic" in the About box. Internet Explorer 7 was audited by Microsoft to ensure that it contained no Mosaic code, and thus no longer credits Spyglass or Mosaic.

After NCSA stopped work on Mosaic, development of the NCSA Mosaic for the X Window System source code was continued by several independent groups. These independent development efforts include mMosaic (multicast Mosaic) which ceased development in early 2004, and Mosaic-CK and VMS Mosaic.

VMS Mosaic, a version specifically targeting OpenVMS operating system, is one of the longest-lived efforts to maintain Mosaic. Using the VMS support already built-in in original version (Bjorn S. Nilsson ported Mosaic 1.2 to VMS in the summer of 1993), developers incorporated a substantial part of the HTML engine from mMosaic, another defunct flavor of the browser. As of the most recent version (4.2), released in 2007, VMS Mosaic supported HTML 4.0, OpenSSL, cookies, and various image formats including GIF, JPEG, PNG, BMP, TGA, TIFF and JPEG 2000 image formats. The browser works on VAX, Alpha, and Itanium platforms.

Another long-lived version, Mosaic-CK, developed by Cameron Kaiser, was last released (version 2.7ck9) on July 11, 2010; a maintenance release with minor compatibility fixes (version 2.7ck10) was released on January 9, 2015, followed by another one (2.7ck11) in October 2015. The stated goal of the project is "Lynx with graphics" and runs on Mac OS X, Power MachTen, Linux and other compatible Unix-like OSs.

See also
History of the World Wide Web
History of the web browser
Comparison of web browsers
List of web browsers
Usage share of web browsers

References

Further reading

External links
 

 

 

 

1993 software
Cross-platform software
Discontinued web browsers
Gopher clients
History of software
History of the Internet
History of web browsers
Macintosh web browsers
OS/2 web browsers
POSIX web browsers
Windows web browsers